Sailing was contested at the 1986 Asian Games in Busan Yachting Center, Busan, South Korea from 23 September 1986 to 29 September 1986.

There were five events in the competition.

Medalists

Medal table

References 
 Asian Games medalists

External links 
 Olympic Council of Asia

 
1986 Asian Games events
1986
Asian Games
Sailing competitions in South Korea